Richard Side is a Canadian writer, producer, and actor known as the creator of The Debaters, a radio and TV comedy series on the Canadian Broadcasting Corporation.

Career 
Side has appeared in episodes of Supernatural, Psych and Eureka and the feature film Elf. Side is a comedian specializing in improvisational comedy. He won an improv comedy championship at the Just for Laughs festival performing with Vancouver Theatresports.

Side co-adapted Kenneth Oppel's novel Silverwing into a thirteen part animated series for Teletoon. Other writing credits include episodes of Kung Fu: The Legend Continues.

Filmography

Film

Television

References

External links
 
 The Debaters

Year of birth missing (living people)
Living people
Canadian male television actors
Canadian male film actors
Canadian comedy writers
Canadian television writers
Canadian radio writers
Canadian male television writers